Thompson is a 1988 British television variety series with actress Emma Thompson. The show also featured Imelda Staunton, Kenneth Branagh and Stephen Moore. The show featured musical numbers, as well as comedy skits and appearances by guest stars. Its theme music was Dave Brubeck's "Unsquare Dance."

External links

British variety television shows
1988 British television series debuts
1988 British television series endings
1980s British comedy television series
BBC Television shows
English-language television shows
Emma Thompson